The Red Mouse is a 1926 German silent film directed by Rudolf Meinert and starring Aud Egede-Nissen, Paul Richter, and Charles Willy Kayser. It premiered at the Marmorhaus in Berlin.

Cast

Bibliography

External links

1926 films
Films of the Weimar Republic
German silent feature films
Films directed by Rudolf Meinert
German black-and-white films